The Ambassador of Australia to Algeria is an officer of the Australian Department of Foreign Affairs and Trade and the head of the Embassy of the Commonwealth of Australia to the People's Democratic Republic of Algeria. Currently the Australian Ambassador to France is responsible for representing Australian interests in Algeria, resident in Paris, France. The current non-resident ambassador, since November 2020, is Gillian Bird .

List of heads of mission

References

Algeria
Australia